Andrei Grigoriyevich Shkuro (Ukrainian: Андрій Григорович Шкуро; 19 January [O.S. 7 January] 1887  – 17 January 1947) was a Lieutenant General (1919) of the White Army.

Biography

Early life
He was born in the stanitsa of Pashkovskaya (Пашковская, now part of Krasnodar) in Kuban Oblast into a Cossack family. Shkuro graduated from Cossack Sotnya of the Nikolaevsky Cavalry School in 1907 and served in the Kuban Cossack Host. 

In World War I Shkuro became the commander of a special partisan unit which executed several daring raids behind German lines. During the war, Shkuro was promoted to the rank of colonel for his heroic performance.

Russian Civil War
In the spring of 1918, after the establishment of the Bolshevik régime, Shkuro organized an anti-Bolshevik Cossack unit in the area of Batalpashinsk in the Caucasus. In May and June 1918 he raided Stavropol, Yessentuki and Kislovodsk. After officially joining Denikin's Volunteer Army, he became the commander of the Kuban Cossacks brigade which soon increased in size and became a division. In May 1919 Shkuro, as a young lieutenant-general, had a whole cavalry corps of Cossacks under his command.

Shkuro, though charismatic and audacious, showed bravery which often bordered on the reckless; he received several wounds, and also acquired a reputation for his cunning. Many in the White Army's high command, however, considered him undisciplined and somewhat of a "loose cannon".

According to Soviet historians his forces (including his chief of staff Yakov Slashchov) were particularly cruel and prone to looting. In contrast, in his memoirs (which Shkuro dictated in 1921) he describes many instances in which he spared the lives of enemies, including even Bolshevik commissars (whom the Whites usually summarily executed). Shkuro claimed that he saved from execution a Red Army battalion of Jewish volunteers taken prisoner by the Whites, and that he spoke out against and prevented pogroms against the Jewish population.
When Denikin's volunteer army took Kiev in August 1919,
however, it inflicted a large-scale pogrom on the Jews. Over 20,000 people died in two days of violence. After these events, Supresskin, the representative of the Kharkov Jewish community, spoke to Shkuro, who stated to him bluntly that "Jews will not receive any mercy because they are all Bolsheviks".

Although the White Army general Pyotr Wrangel valued initiative he also demanded discipline from his subordinates. Wrangel ended up disliking Shkuro, and upon reorganizing the army Wrangel did not give him a command position; this prompted Shkuro's resignation. Shkuro claimed that to the detriment of the anti-Bolshevik cause, both Denikin and Wrangel did not sufficiently understand Cossack society, and that as a result some of their decisions alienated the Cossacks — even though the White Cossacks remained deeply hostile to the policies of the Bolsheviks.

In exile
After the defeat of the Whites, Shkuro lived as an exile, primarily in France and Serbia. For the first few years he and a few other Cossack partners, displaying their great horsemanship, performed in circuses as trick riders across Europe. In addition, he continued to conduct anti-Soviet activities. Russian émigré memoirs depict Shkuro as a very lively man who enjoyed social gatherings with plenty of dancing, singing, drinking, and vivid storytelling about times past.

Second World War

In 1941, Shkuro agreed to be one of the organizers of anti-Soviet Cossack units consisting of White émigrés and Soviet (mostly Cossack) prisoners of war in alliance with Nazi Germany. He, along with many other exiles, hoped that this would lead to the eventual destruction of the Soviet Union. In 1944, Shkuro was placed in command of the "Cossack Reserve", which were primarily deployed in Yugoslavia against Josip Broz Tito's partisans.

In 1945, Shkuro was detained by the British forces in Austria and handed over to the Soviet authorities in Operation Keelhaul. The Military Collegium of the Supreme Court of the Soviet Union sentenced Andrei Shkuro to death. On 17 January 1947, he was executed, together with Pyotr Krasnov, by hanging.

See also

 Pyotr Krasnov
 Repatriation of Cossacks after World War II
 Helmuth von Pannwitz

References

1887 births
1947 deaths
People from Krasnodar
People from Kuban Oblast
Cossacks from the Russian Empire
Generals of the Russian Empire
Anti-communists from the Russian Empire
Russian military personnel of World War I
White movement generals
Warlords
Recipients of the Order of St. Vladimir, 4th class
Recipients of the Order of St. Anna, 2nd class
Recipients of the Order of St. Anna, 3rd class
Recipients of the Order of St. Anna, 4th class
Recipients of the Order of Saint Stanislaus (Russian), 3rd class
Honorary Knights Grand Cross of the Order of the Bath
Recipients of the Iron Cross, 2nd class
White Russian emigrants to France
People extradited to the Soviet Union
People executed by the Soviet Union by hanging
Executed Russian collaborators with Nazi Germany
Executed people from Krasnodar Krai
Russian people executed by the Soviet Union
Antisemitism in Russia